Kormilovsky District is an administrative and municipal district (raion), one of the thirty-two in Omsk Oblast, Russia. It is located in the southern central part of the oblast. Its administrative center is the urban locality (a work settlement) of Kormilovka. Population: 24,726 (2010 Census);  The population of Kormilovka accounts for 38.9% of the district's total population.

Towns and settlements
2nd Fominovka

Notable residents 

Kristina Makarenko (born 1997 in Kormilovka), née Sivkova, sprinter
Viktor Uan (born 1994), football player

References

Notes

Sources

Districts of Omsk Oblast